Fredrik Dahm (born 29 October 1982) is a Norwegian footballer who currently plays for Korsvoll.

Dahm originally came from Lyn's youth department. He played four games in 2000, but was then injured. Ahead of the 2003 season he left Lyn for Lørenskog IF. Ahead of the 2006 season he joined Sparta Sarpsborg. In 2007 and 2008 he played for Drøbak/Frogn IL, before he returned to Lyn before the Norwegian Premier League 2009 season.

He is the older brother of Mads Dahm who has also played for Lyn.

References

1982 births
Living people
Norwegian footballers
Lyn Fotball players
Sarpsborg 08 FF players
Drøbak-Frogn IL players
Norwegian First Division players
Eliteserien players

Association football forwards